James F. "Pete" Petersen Democratic member of the Alaska House of Representatives, that has been serving District 25 in Northeast Anchorage since 2009. Petersen's most high-profile legislation were bills to outlaw price gouging by Alaska oil refineries, and to require health insurance policies to cover treatment for autism.

Background
Pete Petersen was born in Wyoming, Iowa and grew up on a family farm in rural Iowa.  He has lived in Anchorage 2008 and owned and operated a pizza and sandwich delivery restaurant in Anchorage for over 15 years. Petersen is a graduate of the University of Northern Iowa and served as a Peace Corps volunteer in the Dominican Republic.

Legislative career
Petersen was elected to the State House in November 2008 defeating Republican incumbent Bob Roses by 235 votes. In the 26th Alaska State Legislature he served on the House Energy, State Affairs, and Transportation Committees as well as the Finance Subcommittees for the Departments of Education and Early Development and Environmental Conservation.

References

External links
 Official Legislative site
 Official Campaign Website
 Pete Petersen at 100 Years of Alaska's Legislature

1950 births
American restaurateurs
Anchorage Assembly members
Businesspeople from Alaska
Living people
Democratic Party members of the Alaska House of Representatives
People from Jones County, Iowa
University of Northern Iowa alumni
21st-century American politicians